Kalateh-ye Ashian (also Romanized as Kalāteh-ye Āshīān; also known as Kalāgh-ye Āshīān) is a village in Baba Aman Rural District, in the Central District of Bojnord County, North Khorasan Province, Iran. At the 2006 census, its population was 230, in 61 families.

References 

Populated places in Bojnord County